The Little Springs Missionary Baptist Church is a historic church at 4040 Arkansas Highway 58 in Poughkeepsie, Arkansas.  Built in 1946, it is built using a distinctive construction method of wood framing finished in stone in a style known as "giraffe rock", in which the exterior is clad in mortared sandstone slabs.  The main portion of the church is two stories in height and covered by a gable roof, with a gabled entrance vestibule at the center of the front facade.

The building was listed on the National Register of Historic Places in 2016.

See also
National Register of Historic Places listings in Sharp County, Arkansas

References

Baptist churches in Arkansas
Churches on the National Register of Historic Places in Arkansas
Churches completed in 1910
Buildings and structures in Sharp County, Arkansas
National Register of Historic Places in Sharp County, Arkansas